Zenicomus is a genus of longhorn beetles of the subfamily Lamiinae.

 Zenicomus ignicolor Galileo & Martins, 1988
 Zenicomus photuroides Thomson, 1868

References

Calliini
Beetles described in 1868